Carlos Gimeno Gurpegui (born 1965) is a Navarrese politician, Minister of Education of Navarre since August 2019.

References

1965 births
Spanish Socialist Workers' Party politicians
Government ministers of Navarre
Living people
Politicians from Navarre